Group D of the 1999 Fed Cup Europe/Africa Zone Group II was one of four pools in the Europe/Africa zone of the 1999 Fed Cup. Five teams competed in a round robin competition, with the top team advancing to Group I for 2000.

Turkey vs. Macedonia

Ireland vs. Malta

Ireland vs. Macedonia

Malta vs. Algeria

Turkey vs. Malta

Ireland vs. Algeria

Turkey vs. Algeria

Malta vs. Macedonia

Turkey vs. Ireland

Algeria vs. Macedonia

  placed first in this group and thus advanced to Group I for 2000, where they placed last in their pool of four and was thus relegated back to Group II for 2001.

See also
Fed Cup structure

References

External links
 Fed Cup website

1999 Fed Cup Europe/Africa Zone